XHOX-FM is a radio station on 95.3 FM in Tampico, Tamaulipas. It is owned by MVS Radio and carries the Exa FM format.

History
While originally requested by Antonio González Aristi in 1969, XHOX received its concession on November 28, 1972. It was owned by Ernesto Vargas Guajardo and has remained in MVS ownership ever since.

References

External links
Official website
Exa FM 95.3 official website

Contemporary hit radio stations in Mexico
Radio stations in Tampico
MVS Radio